Bambuyan (also Romanized as Bambūyān; also known as Bambeyūn and Bambīūn) is a village in Rigan Rural District, in the Central District of Rigan County, Kerman Province, Iran. At the 2006 census, its population was 760, in 150 families.

References 

Populated places in Rigan County